The Abita Brewing Company is a brewery in Covington, Louisiana, United States, 43 miles (69 km) north of New Orleans. Abita was founded by Jim Patton and Rush Cumming in 1986, in downtown Abita Springs, Louisiana. The original location in downtown Abita Springs is now the Abita Brew Pub.

Brewery

The company brews its beer with water from artesian wells. In August 2005, Stuff Magazine called Abita's Turbodog Ale the best beer made in America. Abita Bock was listed among the Top 10 Spring Beers by Fox News in 2012. Abita Bock is the brewery's first seasonal brew and is available January - March.

Production

In 1986, the company produced 1,500 barrels of beer. In 2011, Abita brewed over 130,000 barrels of beer and 5,000 barrels of root beer. In August 2013, the company announced it would add another 200 barrel brewing system to its existing 100 barrel system, increasing its capacity from 150 bottles per minute to 400 per minute.

The Abita Brewing Company produces seventeen year-round flagship brews (Andy Gator, Strawgator, Abita Amber, Alphagator Golden, Light, Turbodog, Purple Haze, Jockamo I.P.A. and Restoration Pale Ale), five seasonal beers, three Harvest brews, four Big Beers, and others a draft-only series of Select beers and a root beer all from a state-of-the-art brewing complex.

Non-Alcoholic Beverages
The company also produces Abita root beer, which differs from many others in that it is made with Louisiana sugarcane rather than high-fructose corn syrup. Abita also produces a King cake flavored soda, usually sold around Mardi Gras.

Distribution

Abita's flagship beers are sold in 46 US states and Puerto Rico. Abita Brewing Company was the 15th largest Craft Brewery and the 24th largest brewery of any category in the United States ranked by volume sold in 2010.

In February 2012, the company began distribution of three of its flagship brews in cans: Amber, Purple Haze and Jockamo I.P.A.

In 2015, Abita became the first craft beer available in Aruba, exclusively distributed by Bourbon Express and currently by Divino N.V. per April 2018. As from February 2016, Turbodog, Wrought Iron IPA and the Abita Root Beer are also available in Germany.

Abita beer is currently served at Disney's Port Orleans Resort, a hotel/resort located in Walt Disney World in the Orlando, Florida area. The resort, themed after New Orleans, serves Abita on tap at restaurants and bars on site.

Abita Brew Pub

The Abita Brew Pub, under independent ownership, is located at the original brewery location in Abita Springs and features Abita beers, with some brews exclusive to the brew pub, under a close partnership with the brewery.

See also
List of breweries in Louisiana

References

External links 

 

Beer brewing companies based in Louisiana
Buildings and structures in St. Tammany Parish, Louisiana
Tourist attractions in St. Tammany Parish, Louisiana
American companies established in 1986
Food and drink companies established in 1986
1986 establishments in Louisiana